The Polybahn, also known as the UBS Polybahn, is a funicular railway in the city of Zürich, Switzerland. The line links the Central square with the terrace by the main building of ETH Zürich, which was formerly called Eidgenössisches Polytechnikum, and from which the railway derives its name. Previous names for the line include the SBG Polybahn and the Zürichbergbahn. The line is owned by the banking group UBS AG, and operated on their behalf by the municipal transport operator Verkehrsbetriebe Zürich.

The Polybahn is one of two funiculars within the city of Zürich, the other being the Rigiblick funicular in the city's northern suburbs. Additionally, the city's Dolderbahn rack railway was originally a funicular, until its conversion to rack working in the 1970s.

History 
In 1886 a concession for the railway was issued, and the line was opened by the Zürichbergbahn company in 1889. The funicular was initially water-driven (filling water in a ballast tank under the carriage at the top station, emptying at the bottom); the railway was converted to electric drive in 1897.

In 1950 the Zürichbergbahn company began losing money, and eventually (in the 1970s) decided not to renew the concession. In 1972 a foundation was created to help preserve the Polybahn. In 1976 the Union Bank of Switzerland, then known in German as the Schweizerische Bankgesellschaft or SBG, rescued the Polybahn, branding it as the SBG Polybahn. The line and cars were refurbished for a planned 20 more years service.

In 1996 the railway was completely rebuilt. The haulage mechanism was replaced, and fully automated, whilst the old three-rail tracks were replaced with the current two-rail tracks. On 21 October 1996 the railway reopened and is now advertised under the name UBS Polybahn, reflecting the rebranding (in 1998) of the owning banking group as UBS AG. In 1998 the line set a new record, carrying more than 2 million passengers.

On 30 May 2021 the Polybahn was closed for refurbishment, with the cars being removed by crane. The Polybahn reopened on 17 September 2021.

Operation 
The line has the following parameters:

The standard Zürcher Verkehrsverbund zonal fare tariffs apply, with the whole of the line being within fare zone 110 (formerly zone 10) (Zürich city). A special Polybahn ticket is also available; it costs less than the regular 110 fare.

See also 
 List of funicular railways
 List of funiculars in Switzerland

References

External links 

 UBS Polybahn official web site
 Page on the Polybahn from the official web site of the VBZ (in German)
 Funimag article on the Polybahn
 Video of descent of the line from YouTube

Former water-powered funicular railways converted to electricity
Funicular railways in Switzerland
Transport in Zürich
Railway lines opened in 1889
Hochschulen